Lingshan County (postal: Lingshan) is a county under the administration of Qinzhou City in southeastern Guangxi, China.

Administration
Lingshan's executive, legislature and judiciary are seated in Lingcheng Town, together with its CPC and PSB branches. The county administers 18 towns in total:

Climate

References

External links

Counties of Guangxi
Qinzhou